Le Roi Pandore is a 1950 French comedy film starring Bourvil. It was a sizeable box office hit.

References

External links

1950 films
French comedy films
1950 comedy films
French black-and-white films
1950s French films